Niall Saunders (born 21 December 1997) is an Irish rugby union player, currently playing for the Utah Warriors of Major League Rugby (MLR). His preferred position is scrum-half.

Professional career
Saunders signed for Major League Rugby side Utah Warriors for the 2022 Major League Rugby season. Saunders had previously retired from rugby, before returning with Utah in 2022.

References

External links
itsrugby.co.uk Profile

1997 births
Living people
Rugby union scrum-halves
Irish rugby union players
Harlequin F.C. players
Utah Warriors players
Tel Aviv Heat players
English rugby union players
English people of Irish descent
People from Chertsey
Rugby union players from Surrey
English expatriate rugby union players
Irish expatriate rugby union players
English expatriate sportspeople in the United States
English expatriate sportspeople in Israel
Irish expatriate sportspeople in the United States
Irish expatriate sportspeople in Israel
Expatriate rugby union players in Israel
Expatriate rugby union players in the United States